West End-Cobb Town is a census-designated place (CDP) and unincorporated community in Calhoun County, Alabama, United States. At the 2020 census, the population was 3,128. It is included in the Anniston-Oxford Metropolitan Statistical Area.

Geography
West End-Cobb Town is located in southern Calhoun County at  (33.650903, -85.869487). It is bordered to the east and south by the city of Anniston.

Demographics

As of the census of 2010, there were 3,465 people, 1,381 households, and 938 families residing in the community. The racial makeup of the community was 76.1% White, 20.9% Black or African American, 0.5% Native American, 0.2% Asian, 0.0% Pacific Islander, 0.4% from other races, and 1.9% from two or more races. 1.6% of the population were Hispanic or Latino of any race.

There were 1,381 households, out of which 24.1% had children under the age of 18 living with them, 41.6% were married couples living together, 19.2% had a female householder with no husband present, and 32.1% were non-families. 28.2% of all households were made up of individuals, and 11.1% had someone living alone who was 65 years of age or older. The average household size was 2.51 and the average family size was 3.08.

In the community, the population was spread out, with 23.3% under the age of 18, 8.3% from 18 to 24, 24.4% from 25 to 44, 27.8% from 45 to 64, and 16.2% who were 65 years of age or older. The median age was 40.4 years. For every 100 females, there were 94.0 males. For every 100 females age 18 and over, there were 100.1 males.

The median income for a household in the community was $23,269, and the median income for a family was $30,469. Males had a median income of $26,438 versus $28,719 for females. The per capita income for the community was $13,201. About 24.5% of families and 28.3% of the population were below the poverty line, including 45.3% of those under age 18 and 14.1% of those age 65 or over.

References 

Unincorporated communities in Alabama
Census-designated places in Calhoun County, Alabama
Census-designated places in Alabama
Unincorporated communities in Calhoun County, Alabama